The 1969–70 1. Slovenská národná hokejová liga season was the 1st season of the 1. Slovenská národná hokejová liga, the second level of ice hockey in Czechoslovakia alongside the 1. Česká národní hokejová liga. 8 teams participated in the league, and TJ LVS Poprad won the championship.

Regular season

Standings

Qualification to 1970–71 Czechoslovak Extraliga

References

External links
 Season on avlh.sweb.cz (PDF)
 Season on hokejpoprad.sk

Czech
1st. Slovak National Hockey League seasons
2